Heimo Erbse (27 February 1924 – 22 September 2005) was a German composer from Rudolstadt.

Erbse studied in Weimar, and then worked from 1947 to 1950 in the theater before studying under Blacher in 1950. He lived most of his life in Austria.

Works 
 Julietta opera semiseria op. 15 (1957), after the novel "Die Marquise von O..." of Heinrich von Kleist, first performed 17 August 1959 at the Salzburger Festspiele (Antal Dorati/Rita Streich/Sieglinde Wagner/Gerhard Stolze/Walter Berry/Alois Pernerstorfer/Elisabeth Höngen/Wiener Philharmoniker)
 Ruth Ballett (1958), op. 16, after the Old Testament, first performed 1959 at the Wiener Staatsoper
 Pavimento (1961), op. 19, for large orchestra
 Der Herr in Grau, opera op. 24 (1965/66)
 Der Deserteur Oper (1983)
 Triple Concerto for Violin, Cello, Piano and Orchestra, op. 32, 1973
 Piano Concerto op. 22
 Impression for orchestra op. 9
 Ein Traumspiel (August Strindberg)
 Leonce und Lena (Georg Büchner)
 Symphony No. 1, 1963/64
 Symphony No. 2, 1969/70
 Symphony No. 3, 1990
 Symphony No. 4, 1992
 Symphony No. 5, 1993
 Sinfonietta giocosa, 1956
 6 Miniatures for piano, strings, and percussion, 1951
 String Quartet No. 2, 1987
 5 Orchestral Songs after G. Trakl, baritone and orchestra, 1969

References
Don Randel, The Harvard Biographical Dictionary of Music. Harvard, 1996, p. 250.

1924 births
2005 deaths
20th-century classical composers
German classical composers
People from Rudolstadt
German male classical composers
20th-century German composers
20th-century German male musicians